Santa Tereza is a municipality in the state of Rio Grande do Sul, Brazil. It was raised to municipality status in 1992, the area being taken out of the municipalities of Bento Gonçalves, Garibaldi and Roca Sales.  As of 2020, the estimated population was 1,726.

See also
List of municipalities in Rio Grande do Sul

References

Municipalities in Rio Grande do Sul